David Hill is an Ottawa City Councillor representing the ward of Barrhaven West.

Background
Hill is originally from Saskatchewan. He has spent the majority of his career as an infantry officer with the Canadian Army, being deployed in Afghanistan, Haiti and Lebanon. He also previously worked as a gold miner in Northern Ontario. Hill received an undergraduate degree in political economy from the Royal Military College of Canada, followed by a master's degree in government and institutional studies. He also sits on the board of the Barrhaven United Church.

Politics
Hill was elected in the 2022 Ottawa municipal election, with over forty percent of the vote, defeating lawyer Taayo Simmonds, and OC Transpo program manager Jay Chadha. Hill received an endorsement from former Nepean councillor Doug Collins. His campaign placed particular emphasis on roads and traffic management. During his campaign, Hill encountered notable controversy. Specifically, he was captured on video removing a piece of rival candidate Taayo Simmonds' campaign literature from a resident's door and throwing it to the ground. Hill apologized for the incident, describing it as a lapse in judgement.

Electoral record

|-
!rowspan="2" colspan="2"|Candidate
!colspan="3"|Popular vote
!rowspan="2" colspan="2"|Expenditures
|-
! Votes
! %
! ±%
|-
| style="background-color:#41BFB3;" |
| style="text-align:left;"  | David Hill
| style="text-align:right;" | 6,230
| style="text-align:right;" | 43.97
| style="text-align:right;" | –
| style="text-align:right;" |
|-
| style="background-color:#0E73D1;" |
| style="text-align:left;"  | Taayo Simmonds
| style="text-align:right;" | 4,737
| style="text-align:right;" | 33.43
| style="text-align:right;" | –
| style="text-align:right;" |
|-
| style="background-color:#b044fc;" |
| style="text-align:left;"  | Jay Chadha
| style="text-align:right;" | 2,200
| style="text-align:right;" | 15.53
| style="text-align:right;" | –
| style="text-align:right;" |
|-
| style="background-color:#08246c;" |
| style="text-align:left;"  | Sadaf Ebrahim
| style="text-align:right;" | 1,001
| style="text-align:right;" | 7.07
| style="text-align:right;" | –
| style="text-align:right;" |
|-
| style="text-align:right;background-color:#FFFFFF;" colspan="2" |Total valid votes
| style="text-align:right;background-color:#FFFFFF;" | 14,168
| style="text-align:right;background-color:#FFFFFF;" | 98.35
| style="text-align:right;background-color:#c2c2c2;" colspan="2" |
|-
| style="text-align:right;background-color:#FFFFFF;" colspan="2" |Total rejected, unmarked and declined votes
| style="text-align:right;background-color:#FFFFFF;" | 238
| style="text-align:right;background-color:#FFFFFF;" | 1.65
| style="text-align:right;background-color:#c2c2c2;" colspan="2" |
|-
| style="text-align:right;background-color:#FFFFFF;" colspan="2" |Turnout
| style="text-align:right;background-color:#FFFFFF;" | 14,406
| style="text-align:right;background-color:#FFFFFF;" | 45.81
| style="text-align:right;background-color:#FFFFFF;" | +3.10
| style="text-align:right;background-color:#c2c2c2;" |
|- 
| style="text-align:right;background-color:#FFFFFF;" colspan="2" |Eligible voters
| style="text-align:right;background-color:#FFFFFF;" | 31,446
| style="text-align:right;background-color:#c2c2c2;" colspan="3" |
|- 
| style="text-align:left;" colspan="6" |Note: Candidate campaign colours are based on the prominent colour used in campaign items (signs, literature, etc.)and are used as a visual differentiation between candidates.
|- 
| style="text-align:left;" colspan="13" |Sources:
|}

References

Living people
1970s births

Year of birth uncertain
Ottawa city councillors

Royal Military College of Canada alumni
Canadian military personnel of the War in Afghanistan (2001–2021)
Canadian Army officers
Members of the United Church of Canada